Jugurtha Meftah (born July 28, 1990 in Tizi Ouzou) is an Algerian football player. He currently plays for JS Kabylie in the Algerian Ligue Professionnelle 1.

Personal
Meftah was born on July 28, 1990 in Tizi Ouzou. He comes from a long family of footballers, with three of his cousins having already played for JS Kabylie: Mahieddine Meftah, Mohamed Rabie Meftah and Rahim Meftah. Two of them, Mahieddine and Rabie, also played for the Algerian National Team. Another cousin, Chaâbane Meftah, is also a footballer and currently plays for JS Kabylie as well.

Club career
On May 24, 2011, Meftah made his professional debut for JS Kabylie in a league match against ASO Chlef as a 49th-minute substitute for Ibrahim Amada.

References

External links
 DZFoot Profile
 

1990 births
Living people
Algerian footballers
Algerian Ligue Professionnelle 1 players
JS Kabylie players
Kabyle people
Footballers from Tizi Ouzou
Association football defenders
21st-century Algerian people